Uwe "Zico" Bindewald (born 13 August 1968) is a German former professional footballer who played as a defender. He works now as assistant manager of Eintracht Frankfurt's U19 team.

Career 
Bindewald's footballing career began at FSV Dorheim. Other early clubs included SG Melbach-Södel and Kickers Offenbach before he moved in 1986 to Eintracht Frankfurt. After he failed to receive a new contract for the Frankfurt side in 2004, he moved to 1. FC Eschborn. He finished his playing career after the 2004–05 season.

In spite of his role as a defender, Bindewald is regarded a very fair player, having only received one red card in the entirety of his career. In total he played 263 games in the Bundesliga and 123 in the 2. Bundesliga.

In 2008, he worked as assistant manager of Eintracht Frankfurt's Under 19 team, but he decided not to prolong his contract after five months due to financial reasons. In summer 2010, he started working again as assistant manager, this time for  Eintracht Frankfurt's Under 23 team.

Despite his long career and regarded as a reliable defender Bindewald never was capped for the German national team.

References

External links 
 Fussballschule Uwe Bindewald  

1968 births
Living people
People from Friedberg, Hesse
Sportspeople from Darmstadt (region)
German footballers
Kickers Offenbach players
Eintracht Frankfurt players
Eintracht Frankfurt II players
Bundesliga players
2. Bundesliga players
Association football defenders
Footballers from Hesse